Alex Brown (born 16 April 1978) is a Liberian former professional footballer who played as a midfielder. He played in 20 matches for the Liberia national team from 1999 to 2001. He was also named in Liberia's squad for the 2002 African Cup of Nations tournament.

References

External links
 

1978 births
Living people
Liberian footballers
Association football midfielders
Liberia international footballers
2002 African Cup of Nations players
Swiss Super League players
FC Luzern players
FC Sion players
Liberian expatriate footballers
Liberian expatriate sportspeople in Switzerland
Expatriate footballers in Switzerland
Place of birth missing (living people)